Kai Kung Leng is a mountain range in Lam Tsuen Country Park, New Territories, Hong Kong.

Geography 
There are several peaks on this mountain range.

List of selected peaks 
 Lo Tin Teng
 Kai Kung Leng, as known as Tai Lo Tin or formerly Kwai Kok Shan
 Lung Tam Shan
 Kai Kung Shan
 Ngau Tam Shan
 Kei Lun Shan

Disambiguation 
In Hong Kong, there are other similarly named mountains in different regions of the city, such as Kai Kung Shan (399 m) in Sai Kung West Country Park and another Kai Kung Leng in Kat O (122 m).  These locations are all popular hiking spots, so one must plan correctly when visiting.

Illegal Motorcycle activity 
In recent years, various media have reported some motocross bike users have been illegally biking on Kai Kung Leng, making the hillside completely into a piece of bare ground with intensified soil erosion, and knocking down some ancestral graves of indigenous villagers.

See also 

 List of mountains, peaks and hills in Hong Kong
 Lam Tsuen Country Park

References